Drumsonnus (Irish:  (Ridge of prosperity) is a townland in County Tyrone, Northern Ireland. It is situated in the historic barony of Omagh East and the civil parish of Kilskeery and covers an area of 391 acres.

The population of the townland declined during the 19th century:

The townland contains one Scheduled Historic Monument: a henge (grid ref: H2805 5380).

See also
List of townlands of County Tyrone
List of archaeological sites in County Tyrone

References

Townlands of County Tyrone
Archaeological sites in County Tyrone
Barony of Omagh East